Heck-Lee, Heck-Wynne, and Heck-Pool Houses are three historic homes located at Raleigh, Wake County, North Carolina.  They were built between 1871 and 1875, and are -story, "L"-shaped, Second Empire-style frame dwellings on brick foundations.  They feature an Eastlake movement wrap-around porch, a full-height mansard roof and a -story corner mansard tower.  Formerly separate kitchens have been connected to the main house by additions.

It was listed on the National Register of Historic Places in 1973.

References

External links

Historic American Buildings Survey in North Carolina
Houses on the National Register of Historic Places in North Carolina
Second Empire architecture in North Carolina
Houses completed in 1875
Houses in Raleigh, North Carolina
National Register of Historic Places in Raleigh, North Carolina